The men's 100 metres competition at the 1906 Intercalated Games was held at the Panathenaic Stadium in Athens, Greece from 25 to 27 April. A total of 42 athletes from 13 nations competed in the 100 m event.

Summary
The first round of the competition saw several false starts and disqualifications, partly due to the athletes lack of familiarity with the local starter's orders, which were called in Greek. After the first round this issue was rectified. There was no individual timing for each runner and only the winners of each race had their times recorded. Other athletes were ranked visually and in some instances the remaining distance between an athlete and the one behind him was documented.

Four of the six finalists were Americans and two of them took first and second place – Archie Hahn and Fay Moulton. Australia's Nigel Barker came third. Hahn's win built upon his victory from the 1904 Olympic Games. He is sometimes credited with being the first man to retain the Olympic 100 m, but this is disputed as the Intercalated Games have not received official recognition as part of the Olympic series from the International Olympic Committee. Some sports historians argue that the events should be considered part of the true Olympic series as their success helped sustain the modern Olympic movement – the 1900 Summer Olympics and 1904 Summer Olympics were less international and were largely overshadowed by the World's Fairs that the host cities  incorporated the games into.

Schedule

Records

These were the standing world and Olympic records (in seconds) prior to the 1906 Intercalated Games.

 World records before 1912 have not been officially ratified as world records by the International Association of Athletics Federations (IAAF).

Results

Heats
Qualification: First 2 in each heat (Q) advance to the semi-finals. There were ten heats: seven of them contained five runners, while the remaining three had two or three entrants.

From the smaller heats, only Fay Moulton (first in the three-man third heat) and Axel Ljung (second in the two-man seventh heat) participated in the semi-final. In heats eight and ten, the second-placed athletes Vincent Duncker and Meyer Prinstein, did not compete in the semi-final.

Heat 1

Heat 2

Heat 3

Heat 4

Heat 5

Heat 6

Heat 7

Heat 8

Heat 9

Heat 10

Semifinals

Qualification: First 2 in each heat (Q) advance to the Final. The semi-finals were divided into three races: heat one with five runners, heat two with three, and heat three with six.

Semifinal 1

Semifinal 2

Semifinal 3

Final

References

100 metres
Intercalated Games